Receptor-interacting serine/threonine-protein kinase 3 is an enzyme that is encoded by the RIPK3 gene in humans.

The product of this gene is a member of the receptor-interacting protein (RIP) family of serine/threonine protein kinases. It contains a C-terminal domain unique from other RIP family members. The encoded protein is predominantly localized to the cytoplasm, and can undergo nucleocytoplasmic shuttling dependent on novel nuclear localization and export signals. It is a component of the tumor necrosis factor (TNF) receptor-I signaling complex, and can induce necroptosis by interaction with RIPK1 and MLKL in a protein complex termed the necrosome. Interactions between RIPK1 and RIPK3 also form a necrosome, which triggers apoptosis.

Interactions 
RIPK3 has been shown to interact with RIPK1 to form an amyloid spine The RIP Homotypic Interaction Motifs (RHIM) of RIPK3 allows it to form a necrosome with RIPK1. This interaction makes heterotypic β sheets, which bind together to form an alternating “ladder” of Serine from RIPK1 and Cysteine from RIPK3.

References

Further reading